Douthat may refer to:

 Anita Douthat (born 1950), American photographer
 Douthat, Oklahoma, a ghost town
 Douthat State Park, Virginia
 Ross Douthat (born 1979), American conservative author and journalist